José Gómez del Moral (4 December 1931 – 7 August 2021) was a Spanish road racing cyclist. He was a professional cyclist from 1955 to 1963. During this time he won the Volta a Catalunya and the Vuelta a Andalucía in 1955 and the Vuelta a Colombia in 1957. He was the second, and last, non-Colombian winner of the Vuelta a Colombia of the 20th century. He was the brother of cyclist Antonio Gómez del Moral.

Major results

1955
 1st  Overall Volta a Catalunya
 1st  Overall Vuelta a Andalucía
1st Stage 2
 4th Overall Eibarko Bizikleta
 7th Trofeo Masferrer
1956
 2nd Overall Vuelta a Andalucía
 4th Overall Vuelta a la Comunidad Valenciana
1st Stage 2
 8th Overall Eibarko Bizikleta
1957
 1st  Overall Vuelta a Colombia
1st Stage 7
 7th Overall Vuelta a la Comunidad Valenciana
1958
 3rd Overall Vuelta a Andalucía
1st Stage 2
1959
 4th Overall Vuelta a Andalucía
1st Stage 3
 8th Overall Volta a Catalunya
 8th Campeonato Vasco Navarro de Montaña
1960
 2nd Overall Vuelta a Andalucía
 6th Overall Volta a Catalunya
 9th Overall Volta a Portugal
1961
 1st Stage 1a (TTT) Vuelta a España
 3rd Overall Madrid–Barcelona
1962
 7th Overall Vuelta a Andalucía

References

External links 

Spanish male cyclists
1931 births
2021 deaths
Sportspeople from the Province of Córdoba (Spain)